The 2007 WNBA season was the tenth for the Detroit Shock. The Shock qualified for the WNBA Finals for the second consecutive year, losing to the Phoenix Mercury in 5 games.

Offseason

WNBA Draft

Regular season

Season standings

Season Schedule

Player stats
Note: GP= Games played; FG = Field Goals; MIN= Minutes; REB= Rebounds; AST= Assists; STL = Steals; BLK = Blocks; PTS = Points

Playoffs
Won WNBA Eastern Conference Semifinals (2-1) over New York Liberty 
Won WNBA Eastern Conference Finals (2-1) over Indiana Fever
Lost WNBA Finals (3-2) to Phoenix Mercury

References

External links 
Shock on Basketball Reference

 

Detroit Shock seasons
Detroit
Detroit Shock
Eastern Conference (WNBA) championship seasons